Viktor Viktorovich Maigourov (born 7 February 1969) is a former biathlete from Russia.

Career
Maigourov competed for Belarus at the Lillehammer 1994, where he placed fourth on the relay with the Belarusian team. He won eight World Cup victories, his last at Oberhof in 2001. Competing for Russia, he won two Olympic bronze medals; in the relay at the 1998 Nagano Olympics, and in the 20 km at the 2002 Salt Lake City Olympics. His best overall World Cup placing is second in 1995/1996.

Maigourov also won twice at the Holmenkollen ski festival biathlon competition in 1996 with wins in the sprint and pursuit events.

Biathlon results
All results are sourced from the International Biathlon Union.

Olympic Games
2 medals (2 bronze)

*Pursuit was added as an event in 2002.

World Championships
8 medals (3 gold, 4 silver, 1 bronze)

*During Olympic seasons competitions are only held for those events not included in the Olympic program.
**Team was removed as an event in 1998, and pursuit was added in 1997 with mass start being added in 1999.

Individual victories
8 victories (1 In, 4 Sp, 3 Pu)

*Results are from UIPMB and IBU races which include the Biathlon World Cup, Biathlon World Championships and the Winter Olympic Games.

References

External links
 

1969 births
Living people
Sportspeople from Yekaterinburg
Belarusian male biathletes
Russian male biathletes
Biathletes at the 1994 Winter Olympics
Biathletes at the 1998 Winter Olympics
Biathletes at the 2002 Winter Olympics
Olympic biathletes of Belarus
Olympic biathletes of Russia
Medalists at the 1998 Winter Olympics
Medalists at the 2002 Winter Olympics
Olympic medalists in biathlon
Olympic bronze medalists for Russia
Biathlon World Championships medalists
Holmenkollen Ski Festival winners